Edward Robinson (April 10, 1794 – January 27, 1863) was an American biblical scholar known for his magnum opus, Biblical Researches in Palestine, the first major work in Biblical Geography and Biblical Archaeology, which earned him the epithets "Father of Biblical Geography" and "Founder of Modern Palestinology."

He studied in the United States and Germany, a center of biblical scholarship and exploration of the Bible as history. He translated scriptural works from classical languages, as well as German translations. His Greek and English Lexicon of the New Testament (1836; last revision, 1850) became a standard authority in the United States, and was reprinted several times in Great Britain.

Biography
Robinson was born in Southington, Connecticut, and raised on a farm. His father was a minister in the Congregational Church of the town for four decades. The younger Robinson taught at schools in East Haven and Farmington in 1810–11 to earn money for college. He attended Hamilton College, in Clinton, New York, where his maternal uncle, Seth Norton, was a professor. He graduated in 1816.

In 1821 he went to Andover, Massachusetts, where he published his translation of books i–ix, xviii and xix of the Iliad. There he aided Moses Stuart in the preparation of the second edition (1823) of the latter's Hebrew Grammar. He translated into English (1825) Wahl's Clavis Philologica Novi Testamenti.

Robinson went to Europe to study ancient languages, largely in Halle and Berlin (1826–30). While in Halle, in 1828 he married the German writer Therese Albertine Luise. After the couple returned to the United States, Robinson was appointed professor extraordinary of sacred literature at Andover Theological Seminary (1830–33).

Robinson founded the Biblical Repository (1831), which he edited for four years. He also established the Bibliotheca Sacra (1843), into which was merged the Biblical Repository. He spent three years in Boston working on a lexicon of scriptural Greek.

Illness caused him to move to New York City. He was appointed as professor of biblical literature at Union Theological Seminary, serving from 1837 until his death. At the Union Theological Seminary, he also served as the first librarian of the Burke Library.

Exploration of Palestine

In 1836 Robinson published both a translation of Wilhelm Gesenius' Hebrew Lexicon and a Greek New Testament Lexicon.

Robinson traveled to Palestine in 1838 in the company of Rev. Eli Smith. He published Biblical Researches in Palestine in 1841, for which he was awarded the Gold Medal of the Royal Geographical Society in 1842. He was elected a Fellow of the American Academy of Arts and Sciences in 1847.

Robinson, together with Smith, made scores of identifications of ancient places referred to the Bible. His work established his enduring reputation as a "Founder" of Biblical archaeology, and influenced much of future archaeological field work. Examples of his finds in Jerusalem include the Siloam tunnel and Robinson's Arch in the Old City; the latter was named in his honor.

The two men returned to Ottoman Palestine in 1852 for further investigations. In 1856 the enlarged edition of Biblical Researches was published simultaneously in English and German. Among those who later acknowledged Robinson’s stature, in 1941 G. Ernest Wright, reviewing the pioneering survey contained in Nelson Glueck's The Other Side of the Jordan, makes a just comparison and fitting testimonial: "Glueck's explorations are second to none, unless it is those of Edward Robinson."

Published works
 Dictionary of the Holy Bible for the Use of Schools and Young Persons (Boston, 1833)
 Greek and English Lexicon of the New Testament (1836; last revision, New York, 1850), based on the Clavis Philologica Novi Testamenti of Christian A. Wahl.  This work superseded his translation of Wahl's work, becoming a standard authority in the United States. It was several times reprinted in Great Britain.
 Biblical Researches in Palestine and Adjacent Countries (three volumes, Boston and London, 1841; German edition, Halle, 1841; second edition, enlarged, 1856, published in both English and German)
 A Harmony of the Gospels in Greek in the General Order of Le Clerc and Newcome, with Newcome's Notes: Printed from the Text with the Various Readings of Knapp (1834)
 Greek Harmony of the Gospels (1845; second edition, 1851). The Greek text is the Textus Receptus of Elzevir (reproduced by August Hahn). 
 English Harmony of the Gospels (1846)
 Memoir of Rev. William Robinson, with some Account of his Ancestors in this Country (printed privately, New York, 1859) This is a sketch of his father, who for 41 years was pastor of the Congregational church in Southington, Connecticut.
 Physical Geography of the Holy Land (New York and London, 1865). This is a supplement to his Biblical Researches, and was edited by Mrs. Robinson after his death.
Revised editions of the Greek and English Harmonies, edited by Matthew B. Riddle, were published in 1885 and 1886 after Robinson's death.

Robinson edited and translated:
Philipp Karl Buttmann, Greek Grammar (1823; third edition, 1851)
Georg Benedikt Winer, Grammar of New Testament Greek (1825), with Moses Stuart
Christian Abraham Wahl, Clavis Philologica Novi Testamenti (1825)
Wilhelm Gesenius, Hebrew Lexicon of the Old Testament, including the Biblical Chaldee (1836; fifth edition, with corrections and additions, 1854)

He revised:
Augustine Calmet, Dictionary of the Bible (Boston, 1832)

References

Further reading
 R. D. Hitchcock, The Life, Writings, and Character of Edward Robinson (New York, 1863)
  "The Development of Palestine Exploration: Being the Ely Lectures for 1903", Frederick Jones Bliss. (London,1906), Lecture V "Edward Robinson" pp. 184 ff.
  A Centennial Symposium on Edward Robinson: The Critical Faculty of Edward Robinson  by W. F. Stinespring Journal of Biblical Literature, Vol. 58, No. 4. (Dec. 1939), pp. 379–387
Williams, Jay G. The Times and Life of Edward Robinson: Connecticut Yankee in King Solomons Court. Atlanta: Society of Biblical Literature, 1999.
Yehoshua Ben-Arieh, The Rediscovery of the Holy Land in the Nineteenth Century, Magnes Press/Hebrew University/Wayne State University Press, 1979
Renaud Soler, Edward Robinson (1794–1863) et l'émergence de l'archéologie biblique, Paris, Geuthner, 2014
Haim Goren, Mapping the Holy Land : the foundation of a scientific cartography of Palestine, London New York : I.B. Tauris, 2017.
Haim Goren, The loss of a minute is just so much loss of life" : Edward Robinson and Eli Smith in the Holy Land, 2020.

External links
 
 
Works by Robinson, Edward, 1794–1863, on HathiTrust
Edward Robinson Personal Letter

1794 births
1863 deaths
19th-century biblical scholars
American theologians
American archaeologists
Hamilton College (New York) alumni
Archaeologists of the Near East
Biblical archaeologists
Fellows of the American Academy of Arts and Sciences
Union Theological Seminary (New York City) faculty
Columbia University librarians
Holy Land travellers
American travel writers
American male non-fiction writers
American biblical scholars
American geographers
Palestinologists
19th-century geographers
Cartographers of the Middle East
19th-century American translators
19th-century cartographers
People from Southington, Connecticut
19th-century male writers
Historical geographers
History of Jerusalem